Joshua Giddey (born 10 October 2002) is an Australian professional basketball player for the Oklahoma City Thunder of the National Basketball Association (NBA). He was selected by the Thunder with the sixth overall pick in the 2021 NBA draft. Giddey is the youngest player in NBA history to record a triple-double, having done so at 19 years, 84 days old. He also became the first player since Hall of Famer Oscar Robertson in 1961 to record three consecutive triple-doubles as a rookie.

Early life and career
Giddey grew up in Yarraville and attended St Kevin's College in Melbourne from Years 7 to 10, before emerging as one of Australia's top basketball prospects with the NBA Global Academy, a training center at the Australian Institute of Sport (AIS) in Canberra. He attended UC Senior Secondary College Lake Ginninderra alongside his full-time training at the AIS.

At the Australian Under-18 Championships in April 2019, Giddey averaged 20 points, 8.3 rebounds, and six assists per game, leading VIC Metro to the title. In January 2020, Giddey helped the NBA Global Academy win the Torneo Junior Ciutat de L'Hospitalet in Barcelona, where he earned most valuable player (MVP) honors. In the following month at NBA All-Star Weekend in Chicago, he took part in Basketball Without Borders and was named an all-star of the camp.

Professional career

Adelaide 36ers (2020–2021)
On 12 March 2020, Giddey signed with the Adelaide 36ers of the National Basketball League (NBL) as a part of the league's Next Stars program to develop NBA draft prospects, and he became the first Australian player to be a part of the program. Giddey turned down offers from several NCAA Division I programs, including Arizona.

On 26 April 2021, he recorded 12 points, 10 rebounds and 10 assists in a 93–77 loss to the New Zealand Breakers, becoming the youngest Australian in NBL history to record a triple double. In the 36ers' next game against the Brisbane Bullets on 1 May, he became the first ever Australian to record a triple-double in consecutive games, finishing with 15 points, 13 assists, and 11 rebounds in a 101–79 win. He had a third triple-double on 9 May in a 97–88 overtime win over the Sydney Kings, finishing with 11 points, 12 assists and 10 rebounds. Giddey was released from the active playing roster on 17 May to prepare for the 2021 NBA draft, and finished the season averaging 10.9 points, 7.3 rebounds and a league-leading 7.6 assists per game in 28 games played. He was selected as the NBL Rookie of the Year.

Oklahoma City Thunder (2021–present)
On 27 April 2021, Giddey declared for the 2021 NBA draft, where he was projected to be a lottery pick. On 29 July, he was drafted as the sixth overall pick by the Oklahoma City Thunder, and on 8 August, Giddey signed a contract with the Thunder. That same day, he suffered an ankle injury five minutes into his NBA Summer League debut and was ruled out for the rest of the competition as a precautionary measure. On 20 October, Giddey made his NBA debut, putting up four points, 10 rebounds, and three assists in a 107–86 loss to the Utah Jazz. On 27 October, Giddey recorded his first double-double with 18 points and 10 assists in a 123–115 win over the Los Angeles Lakers, while also becoming the third-youngest player to record at least 10 assists in a game, behind only LeBron James, who did so twice. Giddey was named the NBA Western Conference Rookie of the Month for games played in October/November.

On 26 December 2021, Giddey became the second player in NBA history, after Norm Van Lier, to record a scoreless double-double, as he compiled ten assists and ten rebounds in the Thunder's 117–112 win over the New Orleans Pelicans. Giddey was named the NBA Western Conference Rookie of the Month for games played in December. On 2 January 2022, Giddey became the youngest ever player to record a triple-double, with 17 points, 14 assists, and 13 rebounds in a 95–86 loss to the Dallas Mavericks, surpassing the previous record set by LaMelo Ball. Giddey was named the NBA Western Conference Rookie of the Month for games played in January and again in February, winning the award four consecutive times.

On 27 March, Giddey was ruled out for the remainder of the season due to hip soreness, and finished the season averaging 12.5 points, 7.8 rebounds, and 6.4 assists per game while shooting .419, .263, and .709 from the field, the three-point line, and on free throws, respectively, with four triple-doubles. In addition, he was the sole rookie to tally at least 500 points, 400 rebounds, and 300 assists.

On 10 January 2023, in a game against the Miami Heat, Giddey joined Luka Doncic, Ben Simmons, and Grant Hill as the only players in NBA history to record at least 1,000 points, 700 rebounds, and 500 assists in their first 100 career games. On 15 January, Giddey scored a season-high 28 points, recorded 9 rebounds, and recorded 9 assists, while leading Oklahoma City to a 112–102 win over the Brooklyn Nets.

National team career

Junior national team
Giddey represented Australia at the 2019 FIBA Under-17 Oceania Championship in New Caledonia. He averaged 16.4 points, 7.4 rebounds and five assists per game and was named to the All-Star Five after leading his team to a gold medal. In the final against New Zealand, he collected 25 points, eight rebounds, six assists and five steals in an 85–56 win.

Senior national team
On 23 February 2020, Giddey made his debut for the Australia national basketball team during 2021 FIBA Asia Cup qualification. He recorded 11 points, six assists, and three rebounds in 11 minutes, helping Australia defeat Hong Kong, 115–52. Giddey became the youngest player to play for the senior team since Ben Simmons in 2013.

Giddey was one of the final cuts from the Australian basketball team roster for the 2020 Tokyo Olympics and was instead selected as one of three emergency players.

Career statistics

NBA

|-
| style="text-align:left;"| 
| style="text-align:left;"| Oklahoma City
| 54 || 54 || 31.5 || .419 || .263 || .709 || 7.8 || 6.4 || .9 || .4 || 12.5
|- class="sortbottom"
| style="text-align:center;" colspan="2"| Career
| 54 || 54 || 31.5 || .419 || .263 || .709 || 7.8 || 6.4 || .9 || .4 || 12.5

NBL

|-
| style="text-align:left;"| 2020–21
| style="text-align:left;"| Adelaide
| 28 || 26 || 32.1 || .425 || .293 || .691 || 7.3 || 7.6 || 1.1 || .4 || 10.9

Personal life
Giddey's father, Warrick, played basketball professionally and was a longtime player for the Melbourne Tigers in Australia. His mother, Kim, played for the Tigers in the Women's National Basketball League. Giddey's sister, Hannah, played forward for two years for the Oral Roberts Golden Eagles, and then played the 2022-23 season for Southern Nazarene University in Bethany, Oklahoma.

References

External links

NBL profile

2002 births
Living people
Adelaide 36ers players
Australian expatriate basketball people in the United States
Australian men's basketball players
Basketball players from Melbourne
National Basketball Association players from Australia
Oklahoma City Thunder draft picks
Oklahoma City Thunder players
People educated at Lake Ginninderra College
Point guards
21st-century Australian people